Bob White is an unincorporated community located on West Virginia Route 85 in Boone County in the U.S. state of West Virginia. The community's ZIP code is 25028. Most of Bob White's residents are employed by the coal mining industry. The Bob White Post Office closed November 12, 2011.

References

Unincorporated communities in Boone County, West Virginia
Coal towns in West Virginia